Kurohime may refer to

Mount Kurohime, a mountain in Nagano Prefecture, Japan
Kurohime Station, a train station in the vicinity of the mountain
Mahō-tsukai Kurohime, a manga serialized in Monthly Shonen Jump